Sunset Hospital is a former hospital and aged care facility located in Dalkeith, Western Australia. Built in 1906 as the Claremont Old Men's Home, it once housed up to 750 men. The design was based on a military model, made from large stone blocks quarried from local limestone with accommodation for 400 men. It included an infirmary and a hospital.

Design and function
The design comprised three main blocks. Each of these in turn had L shaped dormitories with ablutions placed centrally in an inner quadrangle with two padded cells in B block. There was also a spacious dining room and laundry which had a further  of washing line.

Migration to Sunset
Its name was changed in 1943 to Sunset Hospital, and it was decommissioned in 1995. It was classified by the National Trust in 1993 and heritage listed in 1997.

On 10 January 2013, the Premier of Western Australia, Colin Barnett announced that the site of the former Sunset Hospital would be reopened to the community.  was committed to renovate the  site. To pay for the restoration,  of the site would be sold. Under the plan, all heritage listed buildings would be retained.

References

Further reading

External links

 Sunset Heritage Precinct opens to public - WA Government news, November 2016

Former hospitals in Perth, Western Australia
Hospitals established in 1906
Hospitals disestablished in 1995
1995 disestablishments in Australia
1906 establishments in Australia
State Register of Heritage Places in the City of Nedlands